Saleh Farah Dirir (May 7, 1937 – October 13, 2011) was a Djibutian diplomat.

Career 
He was lecturer on physical science. 
He was advisor Ministry Education and Higher Education of Somalia. 
He was chairman of the science and mathematics division College Education in Somalia.
He was chairman, member and advisor of the national science committee.
He was employed at the National University and the University Senate.
On April 1, 1981, he was designated ambassador in Washington, D.C., where he was accredited from June 4, 1981, to 1987 with coaccredition as Permanent Representative to the Headquarters of the United Nations.
In 1987 he was ambassador in Riyadh (Saudi Arabia) with coaccredition in Abu Dhabi (United Arab Emirates), Nairobi (Kenya) and Kampala (Uganda).

References

1937 births
2011 deaths
Ambassadors of Djibouti to the United States
Permanent Representatives of Djibouti to the United Nations
Ambassadors of Djibouti to Saudi Arabia